Brooke Krueger-Billett (born 9 July 1980 in Tailem Bend) is a female hammer thrower from Australia.

She finished fourth at the 2002 Commonwealth Games, won the gold medal at the 2006 Commonwealth Games and finished seventh at the 2006 IAAF World Cup. In addition she competed at the 2003 World Championships and the 2004 Olympic Games, without reaching the final.

Her personal best is 70.72 metres, achieved in February 2006 in Sydney.

Her uncle Brian Booth is a former cricket and field hockey player. Booth captained Australia's cricketers in two Test matches and was a member of the 1956 Summer Olympics field hockey team for Australia.

Achievements

References

2006 Commonwealth Games profile

1980 births
Living people
Australian female hammer throwers
Athletes (track and field) at the 2002 Commonwealth Games
Athletes (track and field) at the 2006 Commonwealth Games
Athletes (track and field) at the 2004 Summer Olympics
Olympic athletes of Australia
Commonwealth Games gold medallists for Australia
Commonwealth Games medallists in athletics
Medallists at the 2006 Commonwealth Games